Taroudant is a city in the Sous Valley in south western Morocco. It is situated east of Agadir on the road to Ouarzazate and the Sahara desert and south of Marrakesh. The town is known as the "Grandmother of Marrakech" because it looks like a smaller Marrakech with its surrounding ramparts. In the 16th century, the Saadi dynasty briefly used Taroudant as a capital before it moved its royal seat onwards to Marrakesh. Today, the city has the feel of a small fortified market town on a caravan route.

Taroudant is known for its local crafts, including jewellery and carpets.

Unlike Marrakesh, almost the entire city of Taroudant is located inside its walls. A new part of the city is being developed outside the city walls around the campus of a faculty of the Ibn Zohr University of Agadir.

History

The town was occupied by the Almoravids in 1056. Later, the town became the capital of the early Saadian dynasty in the early 16th century.

Today the town is a notable market town and has a souk near each of its two main squares, Assarag and Talmoklate. There is also a weekly souk outside the city walls, near the future university district.

The town walls are nearly 6 kilometres long and are set with bastions and punctuated by nine gates that are still in use. Outside the wall is a small tannery mainly in the business of travel equipment for camel riding, such as goat skin, camel hide sandals, leather bags and belts.

The Berber market, called Jnane jama, sells spices and dried fruits but mostly clothes and household goods. The Berber souk, as well specializes in handicrafts such as terracotta, wrought iron, pottery, brass and copper, leather and carpets, rugs and jewellery.

Notable people
Sana Akroud (born 1980), Moroccan actress, filmmaker, screenwriter, film producer
Ahmed Soultan, Moroccan singer
Amouri M'barek, Moroccan Singer

References

External links
 

Official web site of Taroudant Province

Municipalities of Morocco
Taroudant
Taroudant